Sivannarayana Naripeddi is an Indian actor who works in Telugu films and television. He is best known for his role as 'Appaji' in the popular Telugu TV sitcom Amrutham (20012007). He won the Nandi Award for Best Comedian for Ammamma.com TV show. He acted in more than 150 films including Grahanam (2004), Darling (2010), Amrutham Chandamamalo (2014).

Early life
Sivannarayana was born in Sivaramapuram, Thalluru Mandal, Prakasam district of Andhra Pradesh. He completed his primary education in Sivaramapuram and Thalluru. He shifted to Hyderabad after 1980 and completed his bachelor's degree in Secunderabad. He also completed his master's degree in Theatre at Hyderabad Central University. He has theater experience from his childhood. He is married to Anuradha and has two sons who have settled in London and US.

Career 
After completing his education he worked as an officer in B. S. N. L. He lived in Sangareddy, Secunderabad as part of his job. During this time, he got in touch with different theater groups who perform stage dramas. Because of this stage shows, he got a chance in Amrutham TV serial.

Awards 
 Nandi TV Award for Best Comedian for Amamma.com TV Show

Filmography

TV shows
 Amrutham (20012007)
 Ammamma.com
 Nanna
 Manga Taayaru
 Radha Madhu
 Bharyamani
 Amrutham Dhvitheeyam (2020–2021)

References

External links
 
 Sivannarayana on Facebook

Male actors in Telugu cinema
21st-century Indian male actors
Telugu comedians
Telugu male actors
Indian male film actors
1965 births
Living people
Indian male comedians
Male actors in Telugu television
Indian male television actors
Male actors from Andhra Pradesh
People from Prakasam district